Radixin is a protein that in humans is encoded by the RDX gene.

Radixin is a cytoskeletal protein that may be important in linking actin to the plasma membrane. It is highly similar in sequence to both ezrin and moesin. The radixin gene has been localized by fluorescence in situ hybridization to 11q23. A truncated version representing a pseudogene (RDXP2) was assigned to Xp21.3. Another pseudogene that seemed to lack introns (RDXP1) was mapped to 11p by Southern and PCR analyses.

Interactions 

Radixin has been shown to interact with GNA13.

See also 
 ERM protein family

References

Further reading